George Peabody (1795–1869) was a businessman.

George Peabody may also refer to:

George Foster Peabody (1852–1938), American banker and philanthropist
George Peabody (sculpture), by William Wetmore Story

See also
J.S. Morgan & Co., formerly George Peabody & Co.